The second season of the German singing competition The Masked Singer premiered on 10 March 2020 on ProSieben. Ruth Moschner returned in the panelist, with Rea Garvey, replacing Collien Ulmen-Fernandes and Max Giesinger. Matthias Opdenhövel also returned as host.

In this season, the viewers vote after each Duel or Truel, only via the ProSieben-app.

On 28 April 2020, the Faultier (actor and singer Tom Beck) was declared the winner and the Wuschel (singer Mike Singer) was the runner-up.

On 29 March 2020, ProSieben announced to cease the show's production for two weeks because three people from the production team tested positive with COVID-19. The channel also announced that the show will return on 14 April. In the final, it was revealed that Gregor Meyle, who sang as the Dragon, and Tom Beck, who sang as the Faultier, were the two people who contracted the virus.

Panelists and host

On 24 July 2019, The Masked Singer Germany was renewed for a second season.

Matthias Opdenhövel returned as host. On 25 February 2020, it was announced that the rateteam or panelists would consist of returning TV presenter Ruth Moschner and the new panelist singer Rea Garvey, who was previously a guest panelist in season 1.

As in previous season, a spin-off show named The Masked Singer - red. Special was aired after each live episode, hosted by Viviane Geppert (episodes 1, 3 and 5), Rebecca Mir (episode 2) and Annemarie Carpendale (episode 4 and 6). In the Final Carpendale hosted also, the red. - The Masked Singer Countdown, which aired for 15 Minutes before the final.

Guest panelists
Throughout the season, various guest panelists appeared as the third judge in the judging panel for one episode. These guest panelists included:

Contestants

Episodes

Week 1 (10 March)

Week 2 (17 March)

Week 3 (24 March)

Week 4 (14 April)

Week 5 (21 April) – Semi-final

Week 6 (28 April) – Final
 Group number: "The Greatest Show" by Hugh Jackman, Keala Settle, Zac Efron and Zendaya

Round One

Round Two

Round Three

Reception

Ratings

Notes

References

External links
 

2020 German television seasons
The Masked Singer (German TV series)